East Troy High School is a high school in East Troy, Wisconsin. Enrollment ranges between 500 and 650 students. The team mascot is the Trojan, adopted from the ancient city of Troy.

References

External links
East Troy Community School District website

Public high schools in Wisconsin
Schools in Walworth County, Wisconsin